That's Just the Woman in Me is a one-off American television special by the Canadian singer Celine Dion that was broadcast by CBS on 15 February 2008 and was recorded at the Wiltern Theatre in Los Angeles, California, on 12 January 2008. The show celebrated her return to performing after five years in Las Vegas and was a promotion for her latest studio album, Taking Chances.

The special also marked as Dion's 5th CBS concert since her 2003 Celine in Las Vegas, Opening Night Live special which showed footage of Opening Night performance of her first Vegas residency show A New Day....

The show was quickly put together after the success of An Audience with Celine Dion in the UK. The program featured Celine performing a few of her memorable hits along with new tracks from the album. Special guests included:

 Olivia Trinidad Arias (widow of George Harrison)
 Joe Walsh (from The Eagles)
 David Foster (famous songwriter and producer)
 Halle Berry (Academy Award winner)
 Caroline Rhea (comedian)
 Corbin Bleu (from High School Musical)
 will.i.am (record producer, songwriter and member of The Black Eyed Peas)
 Josh Groban (singer)
 Jennifer Love Hewitt (actress, singer and songwriter)
 Ross McCall (actor)

The show's format was similar to An Audience with..., where Dion was asked questions by the audience. Dion began the show with the triumphant "River Deep Mountain High". Next, she sang the first single from Taking Chances. She dedicated "The Power of Love" to the engaged couple Jennifer Love Hewitt and Ross McCall. The show continued with Dion singing "The Prayer" with Josh Groban. She did a little beatboxing before she performed an unreleased remix of "Eyes on Me" with will.i.am.  She also performed the Beatles song, "Something", with Joe Walsh on guitar and dedicated the song to George Harrison's widow. Dion said that the song had a special place in her heart because it was the first song her son, René Charles, learned to play on the piano. She sang "Alone", a song written by Billy Steinberg and Tom Kelly and popularized by Heart. She closed the show with a song she wanted to record over 15 years ago, "That's Just the Woman in Me".  The song was originally recorded by fellow Eurovision Song Contest winners Katrina & The Waves.

Dion also performed a medley of "It's All Coming Back to Me Now", "Because You Loved Me", and "To Love You More. Additionally, "My Heart Will Go On' was performed as the encore. However, those performances were cut from the broadcast.

Set list
 "River Deep Mountain High"
 "Taking Chances"
 "The Power of Love"
 "The Prayer" (with Josh Groban)
 "Eyes on Me" (remix feat. will.i.am)
 "Something" (with Joe Walsh on guitar)
 "Alone"
 "That's Just the Woman in Me"

References

Celine Dion
CBS television specials